Skid Hill is a 186 metres high hill of eastern Scotland, the highest of the Garleton Hills.


Geology 

The hill origin is volcanic and it shows both trachitic and basic lavas, recognisable thanks to the excavations connected to the disused quarry opened in its eastern flanks.

History 
A hill fort was detected close to the top of Skid Hill, in one area now located on the northern edge of the disused quarry.

Access to the summit 

Very close to the actual summit of Skid Hill stands a trig point. It can be easily accessed on foot from a road flanking the hill by a good track running along the South side of the hill and then by cattle tracks on its western side.

See also

 List of mountains in Scotland
 List of places in East Lothian

References

External links 

 Description of the hill fort on ancientmonuments.uk

Hills of the Scottish Midland Valley
Mountains and hills of East Lothian